Methylnaphthalene may refer to:

 1-Methylnaphthalene
 2-Methylnaphthalene